Paul Chilupe Banda (born June 17, 1989), better known as Just Slim is a Zambian singer, songwriter, Music producer and disc jockey. Paul is an activist of positive living with HIV/AIDS and Ambassador to the Brothers for Life Campaign in Zambia. He made his debut with a single Me which was released on December 1, 2010 along with another single Wachelwa released on the same date and both featured in an MTV documentary entitled Me, Myself and HIV.

Early music career
Just Slim's music career started in 2007 as a producer and song writer. He made his official debut in December 2010 with his first single titled "ME" which followed a number of hit singles. He has also recorded cover songs, such as "Best of Me" (Tyrese) and "Through the Wire" (Kanye West).

Music career 

Paul made his singing debut with a single released in December 2010 entitled Me. In May 2012, the song ME was put as part of a mix-tape entitled "Proof: The Mixtape" which included a reggae cover of Tyrese's "Best of Me" from the album Open Invitation.

He has once played the role of music supervisor on Zambia's Award Winning TV Drama Series: Love Games produced by Media 365 through the Financial and Technical Support from the Government of the Republic of Zambia's National HIV and AIDS Council as well as The United States Agency for International Development (USAID) and US President's Emergency Plan for AIDS Relief-funded Communication Support for Health project.

Paul is working on a new project with producer Shom-C.

Personal life
Paul was born on June 17, 1989 with the HIV virus, but he didn't know until he was about 15.

In 2003, he was diagnosed with tuberculosis and recovered after undergoing treatment. Barely a year later, the TB reoccurred, a development which prompted doctors to recommend that Paul, who was then in secondary school, take an HIV test. Having in mind that he never had any sexual relationship, he found the physician's recommendation very puzzling. This gave his mother the opportunity to disclose her HIV-positive status to him. After receiving some motherly counsel, Paul agreed to go for the HIV test which turned out positive but with a very low immune system whose CD4 count was four.

He decided to come out in the open about his HIV-positive status because he believed that if he talked about it with someone that person might use it against him and also knowing the type discrimination surrounding people living with HIV/AIDS that also compelled him to reveal his HIV status.

Awards
2013 – Bravery Courage & Commitment award – Ministry of Education

Selected songs
 "Pon Replay"
 "Know your status" ft. B Flow
 "Wachelwa"
 "Me"

References

External links
 

21st-century Zambian male singers
1989 births
Living people
People from Lusaka